Eupanacra hollowayi is a moth of the  family Sphingidae. It is known from south-east Asia, including Malaysia, Borneo and Thailand.

There is a broad pale green band on the thorax and abdomen and a prominent white subapical zig-zag mark on the forewing. The median dark oblique line fades just before the apex. There are distinct pale orange submarginal lunules on the hindwing and a prominent pale green mark.

References

Eupanacra
Moths described in 1991